The Homegrown Invitational Cup is a collegiate basketball tournament in the Philippines. It aims to determine which is the best "homegrown" collegiate team. Homegrown players are those who came directly from the juniors team of the said school.  As a rule, each team must have at least 3 players from its roster who came from their junior ranks.

The league gained TV coverage in 2006 through Studio 23. Fil-Oil and Flying V are the main sponsors of the tournament.

2006 Season

Participating Teams
UAAP
Ateneo de Manila University Blue Eagles 
De La Salle University Green Archers 
Far Eastern University Tamaraws
University of the East Red Warriors
University of the Philippines Fighting Maroons
University of Santo Tomas Growling Tigers
NCAA
Colegio de San Juan de Letran Knights
Jose Rizal University Heavy Bombers
San Beda College Red Lions
San Sebastian College - Recoletos Stags

Format
 Each team must have at least 3 homegrown players in their roster.
 Cross over single-round robin format. 
 Top two teams in each group battle in the semifinals.
 Single game championship.

Elimination round

Group A

Group B

Playoffs

Awards

Tournament MVP: Rico Maierhofer (De La Salle University)
Mythical Five:
Guard: JVee Casio (De La Salle University)
Guard: James Martinez (University of the East) 
Forward: Paul Sanga (Far Eastern University) 
Forward: Rico Maierhofer (De La Salle University)
Center: James Sena (Jose Rizal University)

References 

College men's basketball competitions in the Philippines